"Hurt Feelings" is a 2009 song by Flight of the Conchords.

Hurt feelings may also refer to:

 "Hurt feelings", a subtype of social pain
 "Hurt Feelings", a song by Mac Miller from his 2018 album Swimming

See also
 "Hurting the feelings of the Chinese people", a Chinese political catchphrase